Wangetti is a coastal town and a locality in the Shire of Douglas, Queensland, Australia.

Geography 
The Captain Cook Highway runs through the locality from south to north mostly hugging the coastline.

The land is mostly undeveloped and, apart from a small area of freehold land around the town of Wangetii, the vast majority of the locality is part of the Macalister Range National Park. There is no public access to the national park because it is an important cassowary habitat and part of the Wet Tropics World Heritage Area.

The Southedge-Wangetti Road, also known as Quaid Road is a road that was completed by the government in 1989 with no public access linking Wangetti to Southedge.

History

Attractions 
Hartley's Crocodile Adventures is a zoo and farm featuring crocodiles and other Australian animals. They were the first place in Australian to breed crocodiles.

Education 
Cape York Girl Academy is a private secondary (7-12) boarding school for young Indigenous mothers  at 4099 Captain Cook Highway. In 2017, the school had an enrolment of 21 students with 3 teachers and 7 non-teaching staff (6 full-time equivalent). Teenage pregnancies often cause a young Indigenous women to drop out of education, so the school was established with the specific aim to enable young Indigenous mothers to complete their education while raising their babies in a supportive environment.

References

External links 
 Town map of Wangetti, 1981

Towns in Queensland
Shire of Douglas
Coastline of Queensland
Localities in Queensland